Čelevec is a small settlement in the Municipality of Šmarješke Toplice in the historical region of Lower Carniola in southeastern Slovenia. The municipality is now included in the Southeast Slovenia Statistical Region.

References

External links
Čelevec at Geopedia

Populated places in the Municipality of Šmarješke Toplice